Ezharakoottam is a 1995 Indian Malayalam film, directed by Kareem. The film stars Manoj K. Jayan, Dileep, Geetha, Madhupal, and Nadirsha in the lead roles. The film has musical score by Johnson.

Cast
Manoj K. Jayan as Vishwanathan
Dileep as Ara
Geetha as Susanna
Madhupal as Balu
Nadirsha as Antappan
Tonny
Kalabhavan Navas
Girish 
Shuhaib
Prasanth
Narendra prasad as Andrews Nicolas
Rajan P. Dev as Vakkachan
Lekha Ramachandran as Maria
Premachandran as Lazar
Santhakumari as Jaanuvamma
Baburaj

Soundtrack
The music was composed by Johnson and the lyrics were written by Shibu Chakravarthy.

References

External links
 

1995 films
1990s Malayalam-language films